Chorology (from Greek , khōros, "place, space"; and , -logia) can mean
 the study of the causal relations between geographical phenomena occurring within a particular region
 the study of the spatial distribution of organisms (biogeography).

In geography, the term was first used by Strabo. In the twentieth century, Richard Hartshorne worked on that notion again. The term was popularized by Ferdinand von Richthofen.

See also
Chorography
Khôra

References

Biogeography